Remixes is a remix compilation album by cantopop singer Prudence Liew, released in 1989.

Background information
As Liew was pregnant with her second child after the release of Loving Prince 公子多情, she was on maternity leave for much of 1989.  To tie fans over until the release of her next album, Jokingly Saying 笑說, Current Records released an EP titled Fate 緣, and this remix album with songs spanning from her debut album Prudence Liew 劉美君 to Loving Prince 公子多情.

Track listing

References

Prudence Liew albums
1989 remix albums
Sony Music Hong Kong remix albums